Greg Douglas may refer to:

 Greg Douglas (Holby City), a character in the British TV series Holby City
 Greg Douglas (sailor), Canadian sailor

See also
 Greg Douglass, American rock guitarist